Highway Racer (originally titled Poliziotto sprint) is a 1977 Italian poliziottesco film directed by Stelvio Massi. It was the first collaboration between Massi and Maurizio Merli, who worked together in six titles between 1977 and 1980.

The plot of the film was partly inspired by the career of Armando Spatafora, an Italian "flying squad" police officer whose patrol car was a Ferrari 250 GTE. Many car chases in the film, such as bank robbers in a Citroen DS as well as cars rolling down the Spanish steps, mirror famous police chases in Rome during the 1960s.

Cast 
Maurizio Merli as Marco Palma 
Angelo Infanti as Jean-Paul Dossena il "Nizzardo" 
Giancarlo Sbragia as Maresciallo Tagliaferri 
Lilli Carati as Francesca 
Orazio Orlando as Silicato
Glauco Onorato as Pistone

Production
Highway Racer was the first of six films starring Maurizio Merli that director Stelvio Massi directed between 1977 and 1980. When he was shooting his third film in the Mark the Cop series, Merli met Massi who was busy shooting Special Cop in Action for Marino Girolami.
Highway Racer was shot on location in Rome.

Release
Highway Racer was released in Italy on August 10, 1977 where it was distributed by Titanus. The film premiered at the Brancaccio cinema in Rome. It grossed a total of 1.308 billion Italian lira in Italy, which lead to Roberto Curti described as film being a "box office hit" in Italy.

Reception
From contemporary reviews, Italian critics generally gave the film better reviews than the usual Italian crime films, with one critic describing it as "more amiable and astute than other films of its ilk, because it's more spectacular in its 'police and thieves on four wheels' game."

References

Footnotes

Sources

External links

1977 films
Poliziotteschi films
Films shot in Rome
Films set in Rome
Titanus films
Films scored by Stelvio Cipriani
1970s chase films
Films about automobiles
1970s Italian films
Films directed by Stelvio Massi